Nic, Nick, Nicky or Nicholas Adams may refer to:

Performers
Nick Adams (actor, born 1931) (1931–1968), American TV, film and theater actor
Nick Adams (actor, born 1983), American musical theater dancer
Nic Adams, Australian guitarist, co-founder of 2011 deathcore band Justice for the Damned

Politicians
Nicholas Adams (died 1584) (c.1521–c.1584), English MP for West Looe and Dartmouth
Nicholas Adams (died 1628), English MP for Pembroke (UK Parliament constituency)
Nick Adams (commentator) also known as Nick Adamopoulos (born 1985), former local councillor and American conservative author

Sportsmen
Nick Adams (racing driver) (born 1948), English sportscar competitor
Nicholas Adams (cricketer) (born 1967), English right-handed batsman
Nick Adams (rugby union) (born 1977), English prop and coach
Nicky Adams (born 1986), English footballer

Writers
Nicholas Adams, joint pen name of married American novelists Debra Doyle (1952–2020) and James D. Macdonald (born 1954)
Nicholas Adams, pen name of English novelist John Peel (writer) (born 1954)
Nick Adams (writer) (born 1973), African American author of Making Friends with Black People

Characters
 Nick Adams (character), American protagonist of Hemingway's 1920s/1930s short stories

See also
Nicholas Adam (1716–1792), French linguist and translator
Nicolas Adames (1813–1887), first Bishop of Luxembourg
Nic Adam (1881–1957), Luxembourgian Olympic gymnast